Area code 262 is a telephone area code in the North American Numbering Plan (NANP) for southeastern Wisconsin, and was created on September 25, 1999, in an area code split of area code 414. The numbering plan area comprises most suburbs of Milwaukee, but not Milwaukee County.

History
The eastern portion of Wisconsin had been served by 414 for half a century until Green Bay and the Fox River Valley split off as area code 920 in 1997. Although this was intended as a long-term solution, within a year 414 was back to the brink of exhaustion due to the continued proliferation of cell phones and pagers. When it became apparent that 414 was running out of numbers, original plans called for 262 to be an overlay for all of southeastern Wisconsin. However, overlays were a new concept at the time, and met with some resistance to the mixing of area codes in the same area and the ensuing requirement for ten-digit dialing. As a result, 262 was made a separate area code for nearly all of the old 414 territory outside Milwaukee County. A few slivers of Waukesha and Washington counties stayed in 414.

Despite the Milwaukee area's continued growth, 262 is nowhere near exhaustion. Projections in early 2019 suggested the Milwaukee suburbs would not need another area code until 2044 at the earliest, but later in 2019 no exhaust date was listed, meaning the date is 30 years or more in the future.

Prior to October 2021, area code 262 had telephone numbers assigned for the central office code 988. In 2020, 988 was designated nationwide as a dialing code for the National Suicide Prevention Lifeline, which created a conflict for exchanges that permit seven-digit dialing. This area code was therefore scheduled to transition to ten-digit dialing by October 24, 2021.

Service area
The area code serves the following counties:
 Kenosha, Ozaukee, Racine, Walworth, Washington (shared with 414), and Waukesha (shared with 414)

This includes the cities, towns, and villages of

See also
List of NANP area codes

References

External links

Map at Wisconline.com adopted from NANPA information
List of exchanges from AreaCodeDownload.com, 262 Area Code

262
262
Telecommunications-related introductions in 1999